Charles Elden Kingston (October 10, 1909 – July 8, 1948 ) was the founder of the Davis County Cooperative Society in 1935.

Elden Kingston was supported by his father Charles W. Kingston, his mother Vesta Minerva Kingston, and his siblings as the leader of the Davis County Cooperative Society. In 1941 Elden Kingston legally organized his cooperative as the Davis County Cooperative Society.

References

D. Michael Quinn, "Plural Marriage and Mormon Fundamentalism", Dialogue: A Journal of Mormon Thought 31(2) (Summer 1998): 1–68, accessed 6 June 2009.
.

1948 deaths
Mormon fundamentalist leaders
People from Davis County, Utah
1909 births
American Latter Day Saint leaders